Eupatorus is a genus of rhinoceros beetles (subfamily Dynastinae of the family Scarabaeidae).

Species
The genus contains the following species, typically found in Indo-China:
 Eupatorus birmanicus Arrow, 1908
 Eupatorus endoi Nagai, 1999
 Eupatorus gracilicornis Arrow, 1908
 Eupatorus hardwickei (Hope, 1831)
 Eupatorus koletta Voirin, 1978
 Eupatorus siamensis (Castelnau, 1867)
 Eupatorus sukkiti Miyashita & Arnaud, 1996

References

Insects of Asia
Dynastinae
Scarabaeidae genera